Ischnoderma is a genus of polypore fungi. Species in the genus have dark brown and tomentose fruit bodies that become darker brown to black and smooth when mature. The genus, widespread in temperate regions, contains an estimated 10 species.

Taxonomy
Ischnoderma was circumscribed by Finnish mycologist Petter Adolf Karsten in 1879. Although Ischnoderma has traditionally been classified in the family Fomitopsidaceae, Phylogenetic studies have demonstrated its isolated phylogenetic position in the Polyporales. Justo and colleagues suggest that Ischnoderma would be better placed as the type genus of Ischnodermataceae, a family originally proposed by Walter Jülich in 1981.

Chemistry
The type species, I. resinosum, is used in mushroom dyeing to produce various shades of brown. It has been shown to efficiently decolorize several structurally different synthetic dyes: amaranth, Remazol Brilliant Blue R, Phthalocyanine Blue BN, and Poly R-478. Ischnoderma benzoinum has antiviral activity against type A influenza virus of birds and humans.

Uses
Young, fleshy specimens of both I. resinosum and I. benzoinum may be cooked and eaten, but the species become hard and inedible later in life.

Species
Ischnoderma albotextum (Lloyd) D.A.Reid (1973)
Ischnoderma benzoinum (Wahlenb.) P.Karst. (1881)
Ischnoderma brasiliense Corner (1989)– Brazil
Ischnoderma friabile Corner (1989) – Papua New Guinea
Ischnoderma fuscum (Pilát) Rauschert (1990)
Ischnoderma novo-guineense Imazeki (1952) – Japan
Ischnoderma porphyrites Corner (1989) – Brazil
Ischnoderma resinosum (Schrad.) P.Karst. (1879)
Ischnoderma rosulatum (G.Cunn.) P.K.Buchanan & Ryvarden (1988) – New Zealand
Ischnoderma solomonense Corner (1989) – South Solomons

References

Fomitopsidaceae
Polyporales genera
Taxa named by Petter Adolf Karsten
Taxa described in 1879